The Carrian Group was a Hong Kong conglomerate that was known for rapid expansion in the 1980s, which ended in collapse amidst a major corruption and fraud scandal.

Founding

Carrian was founded in 1977 by George Tan Soon-gin, who fled Singapore following a bankruptcy in 1974.

Operations
The company, at various points of its existence, had operations in pesticide, tourism, shipping, insurance, taxi fleets, and restaurants.

However, the company's main business is noted to be in real estate.

History
In January 1980, the group, through a 75% owned subsidiary, purchased Gammon House (a commercial office building, now Bank of America Tower) in Central District, Hong Kong for HK$998 million. It grabbed the limelight in April 1980 when it announced the sale of Gammon House for HK$1.68 billion, a high return on investment that surprised Hong Kong's property and financial markets and developed public interest in Carrian.

In the same year, Carrian capitalised on its notoriety by acquiring a publicly listed Hong Kong company, renaming it Carrian Investments Ltd., and using it as a vehicle to raise funds from the financial markets.

The group grew rapidly in the early 1980s to include properties in Malaysia, Thailand, Singapore, Philippines, Japan, and the United States. Its rapid expansion has led to rumors over the source of its capital, with various rumors speculating the capital came from Imelda Marcos, Gosbank, and a lumber corporation in Borneo.

Downfall

Carrian Group became involved in a scandal with Bank Bumiputra Malaysia Berhad of Malaysia and its Hong Kong-based subsidiary Bumiputra Malaysia Finance. Following allegations of accounting fraud, a murder of a bank auditor, and the suicide of the firm's adviser, the Carrian Group collapsed in 1983, the largest bankruptcy in Hong Kong.

The scandal and its ultimate downfall eventually exposed the mystery surrounding the seemingly inexhaustible capital that Carrian had as nothing more than loans from banking institutions.

Legacy
Almost no traces of Carrian Group remain following its collapse. A Hong Kong restaurant that specializes in Teochew cuisine, Carriana, was loosely named after Carrian due to links between one of its former owners, Chim Pui-chung, and Carrian. Carriana is currently a listed company in Hong Kong

Media portrayal
The 2020 TVB drama series Of Greed and Ants (黃金有罪) is based on various aspects of the fraud scandal that Carrian Group was engulfed in.

Books

References

External links
Independent Commission Against Corruption (Hong Kong): Report on Carrian
Philip Bowring's summary article on Carrian

Corporate scandals
Corporate crime
Land developers of Hong Kong
Defunct companies of Hong Kong
Construction and civil engineering companies established in 1977
Conglomerate companies disestablished in 1983
Political scandals in Malaysia
1977 establishments in Hong Kong
Holding companies established in 1977
1983 disestablishments in Hong Kong
Conglomerate companies established in 1977